Juan Carlos Rojas Díaz (born 17 December 1945) is a Paraguayan footballer who played as a midfielder. He appeared in 17 matches for the Paraguay national team from 1965 to 1967. He was also part of Paraguay's squad for the 1967 South American Championship.

References

External links
 Juan Rojas at BDFutbol
 

1945 births
Living people
Paraguayan footballers
Paraguay international footballers
Association football midfielders
Cerro Porteño players
Córdoba CF players
Xerez CD footballers
La Liga players
Segunda División players
Paraguayan expatriate footballers
Paraguayan expatriate sportspeople in Spain
Expatriate footballers in Spain
Sportspeople from Asunción